Elysia margaritae is a species of sea slug, a marine gastropod mollusc.

This sea slug resembles a nudibranch, but it is not closely related to that order of gastropods.  It is instead a sacoglossan. It is known from the Mediterranean Sea and Adriatic Sea.

Description
The colour is dappled yellowish-green and fawn with fine red speckles, especially on the pinkish parts of the head, the parapodia and rhinophores. The parapodia are edged with dark green and small white thickened areas. The egg mass is distinctive, the white eggs having orange yolks lying beside their capsules.

References

Plakobranchidae
Gastropods described in 1988